The wild duck is the non-domesticated ancestor of the domestic duck.

Wild duck may refer to:

 Mallard
 Muscovy duck

Birds by common name